Morris Matthews (born February 25, 2003) is an American professional soccer player who plays as a defender for USL League One club New England Revolution II via the New England Revolution academy.

Career

Youth
Matthews joined the New England Revolution academy in 2016. In 2020, Matthews spent time with the club's USL League One affiliate team New England Revolution II. He made his debut on August 15, 2020, appearing as an injury-time substitute during a 3–3 draw with North Texas SC.

References

External links 
 
 ussoccerda.com profile

2003 births
American soccer players
Association football defenders
Living people
Soccer players from Massachusetts
Sportspeople from Cambridge, Massachusetts
New England Revolution II players
USL League One players